The Jewish Virtual Library (JVL, formerly known as JSOURCE) is an online encyclopedia published by the American foreign policy analyst Mitchell Bard's non-profit organization American–Israeli Cooperative Enterprise (AICE). It is a website covering topics about Israel–United States relations, Jewish history, Israel, the Holocaust, antisemitism and Judaism.

The website includes the book Myths and Facts. The book was originally written by Leonard Davis and published in 1964. Later editions were written by Bard who describes it as "the pro-Israel activist's 'bible. 

The JVL also includes the website stopbds.com which aims to combat the Boycott, Divestment and Sanctions movement.

Overview

Sources
The Jewish Virtual Library relies on history books, scientific studies, various encyclopedias, archives, polls, maps, and material from museums for its bibliography, as well as Wikipedia articles. According to the JVL, it received permission to use materials from the Library of Congress, the American Jewish Historical Society, the Anti-Defamation League, the Simon Wiesenthal Center, the Israeli Ministry of Foreign Affairs and Prime Minister's Office, Rabbi Joseph Telushkin and other resources. Mitchell G. Bard is the founder and Executive Director.

Sections, topics
The Library has 13 sections: Anti-Semitism, History, Myths and Facts, Women, The Holocaust, Travel, Maps, Politics, Biography, Israel, Israel Education, Religion, Judaic Treasures of the Library of Congress, and Vital Statistics and Reference.

The JVL hosts more than 60,000 articles and nearly 10,000 photographs and maps related to Jewish history, Israel, Israel–United States relations, the Holocaust, antisemitism and Judaism, as well as various statistics, information about politics, biographies, travel guides, and a section on Jewish women throughout history. The website includes the complete text of the Tanakh and most of the Babylonian Talmud.

It contains information about Israel education in America, including information about Israel Studies. The website aims to document the relationship between Israel and each of the 50 states, and publish declassified documents from sources such as the CIA, State Department and British Foreign Service that reveal insights into those organizations' attitudes toward Jews and Israel.

Praise and criticism 

The website has been praised for its accessible interface and balanced information. Librarian John Jaeger, in a 2002 article published by the Association of College and Research Libraries, wrote:

Also in 2002, Karen Evans of Indiana State University praised the online library for its "easily accessible, balanced information". J. Douglas Smith and Richard Jensen in their book World War II on the Web: A Guide to the Very Best Sites with free CD-ROM published in 2002 also heaped praise on the website:

They gave it four star out of five in the categories content, aesthetics and navigation.

But the website and its book Myths and Facts have also been criticised for pro-Israel bias. In 1987, Clifford A. Wright, author of Facts and Fables: The Real Story Behind the Arab-Israeli Conflict, dismissed Myths and Facts 1985 (published 1984) in a Spring 1987 Journal of Palestine Studies review entitled Partisan "Facts" as Zionist propaganda:

American journalist Donald Neff in his Summer 2002 Journal of Palestine Studies review entitled Rewriting History of the 2001 edition was equally critical:

References

External links
 
 Official YouTube page

Encyclopedias of culture and ethnicity
Jewish literature
Jewish charities based in the United States
American online encyclopedias
Jewish encyclopedias
Jewish websites
Internet properties established in 1998